Verrucularina is a genus of flowering plants belonging to the family Malpighiaceae.

Its native range is Brazil.

Species:
 Verrucularina glaucophylla (A.Juss.) Rauschert 
 Verrucularina piresii (W.R.Anderson) Rauschert

References

Malpighiaceae
Malpighiaceae genera